Hanging Wood may refer to: 

Hanging Wood, South Yorkshire
Hanging Wood, London